Internationale Handelsgesellschaft mbH v Einfuhr- und Vorratsstelle für Getreide und Futtermittel (1970) Case 11/70 is an EU law case and German constitutional law case concerning the conflict of law between a national legal system and the laws of the European Union.

Facts
The Common Agricultural Policy permitted exports only by exporters who obtained an export licence, on a deposit of money, that could be forfeited if they failed to make the export during the licence’s validity period. The Internationale Handelsgesellschaft mbH claimed that the licensing system was a disproportionate violation of their right to conduct a business under the German constitution (Grundgesetz), because it did more than was necessary to achieve the public objective at hand.

The German Administrative Court (Verwaltungsgericht) made a reference to the ECJ.

Judgment

European Court of Justice
The ECJ held that the validity of EU measures cannot be challenged on grounds of national law rules or concepts, even if that is a violation of fundamental human rights provisions in a member state’s constitution. European Community law did, however, respect fundamental rights, as in member state systems. But here there was no fundamental right violation.

The case then returned to the German Administrative Court (Verwaltungsgericht). Given the conflict it potentially faced, it then requested a ruling from the German Constitutional Court.

German Constitutional Court
The German Constitutional Court (Bundesverfassungsgericht) held that so long as fundamental rights protection was evident, it would not scrutinise EU action in detail.

Significance

The case is important because it addresses what appears to be one of the most difficult challenges facing the acceptance of the supremacy of European law within the German legal order, that is, the possibility of conflict between a European law obligation and a fundamental right protected by the German Constitution. As Weiler has argued, it was virtually impossible that the national courts would accept European law supremacy without a guarantee of human rights protection. In this light, the significance of Internationale Handelsgesellschaft was that the European Court of Justice itself took on a role protecting the fundamental rights of individuals in the European legal order, allowing the German Constitutional Court to adopt an accommodating approach to the continuing development of the supremacy of European law within the German legal order.
 
This approach to the case may perhaps overemphasise the sensitivity and difficulty of the problem however. The judgments of the German Constitutional Court on possible conflicts between treaty obligations and German constitutional rights throughout the postwar era demonstrate that the Court has been extremely cautious about finding that Germany’s treaty obligations violate the fundamental rights protected by the German Constitution, and indeed that the German Constitutional Court has consistently tended to accommodate the constitutionality of such treaty obligations since the 1950s.

Subsequently, in Re Wünsche Handelsgesellschaft in a case where an EC import licensing system was challenged in the German Court, but held valid by the ECJ, the BVerfGE revised its approach. It held that because, since 1974, the ECJ had developed protection for fundamental rights, declarations on rights and democracy had been made by the Community institutions, and all EC Member States had acceded to the European Convention on Human Rights, it would no longer scrutinise EU law in every case. It said,

This is popularly known as the Solange II judgment.

See also

European Union law
Stauder v City of Ulm, a landmark case (1969) concerning the protection of human rights in the European Union

Notes

European Union company case law
Federal Constitutional Court cases
1970 in case law
1970 in West Germany